Theatrhythm Dragon Quest is a rhythm game developed by indieszero and published by Square Enix for the Nintendo 3DS. It was released in Japan on March 26, 2015, and was the first game of its type in the Dragon Quest series and the third Theatrhythm game after Theatrhythm Final Fantasy and Theatrhythm Final Fantasy: Curtain Call.

Gameplay

Theatrhythm Dragon Quest features 65 musical pieces selected from the Dragon Quest series, all originally composed by Koichi Sugiyama. Additional tracks were released as downloadable content via the Nintendo eShop.

There are three game modes: challenge mode, music-play and Casino. While tracks can be unlocked in challenge mode, playable characters can be unlocked in Casino.

Development
Theatrhythm Dragon Quest was first announced at Jump Festa 2015 on December 10, 2014, with a playable demo. A trial version was released on March 11, and a smartphone app called Intro Quiz Battle was released on March 20, 2015. The app has players listen to songs from Dragon Quest games and answer questions about them until the app was shut down on April 30, 2015.

Producer Ichiro Hazama mentioned in an interview that developers would monitor fan feedback as to what additional songs would be included as downloadable content. The first collection of DLC was previewed a week before the game was released in March 2015 and featured five songs, one from each of the first five Dragon Quest games. A second DLC song collection from Dragon Quests III through V was released in April 2015. A fourth DLC packet of four songs was made available free of charge in May 2015.

Reception
Famitsu scored Theatrhythm Dragon Quest a 35/40. More than 76,000 copies were sold in its first week, making it the best-selling Nintendo 3DS game in that week.

References

External links
 

2015 video games
Dragon Quest spin-off games
Indieszero games
Japan-exclusive video games
Multiplayer and single-player video games
Music video games
Nintendo 3DS eShop games
Nintendo 3DS games
Nintendo 3DS-only games
Nintendo Network games
Square Enix games
Video games developed in Japan